Black Moon Rising is a 1986 science fiction action thriller film directed by Harley Cokliss, written by John Carpenter, and starring Tommy Lee Jones, Linda Hamilton, Robert Vaughn,	Keenan Wynn, and Richard Jaeckel. The plot revolves around the theft of a prototype vehicle called the Black Moon.

Plot

Sam Quint (Tommy Lee Jones) is a former thief hired by the FBI to steal a computer disk which contains incriminating evidence against The Lucky Dollar Corporation of Las Vegas. After stealing the disk, Quint is pursued by Marvin Ringer (Lee Ving), another former thief and acquaintance who works for the company. Quint and Windom later cross paths at a gas station, where Quint hides the disk in the back bumper of the Black Moon. Windom is hauling the Black Moon to Los Angeles, and Quint, still being pursued by Ringer and his men, follows Windom and his team there.

In L.A., Quint meets with FBI agent Johnson (Bubba Smith) and demands double pay and a clean passport so he can retire since he is now dealing with Ringer. Quint tails Windom and the Black Moon to a posh restaurant, where Windom is negotiating a deal to sell the prototype to a car manufacturer. Before Quint can get to the disk, a group of auto thieves, led by Nina (Linda Hamilton), steals all of the cars in the parking lot, including the Black Moon off of its trailer. Quint gives chase, and tracks the cars to an office tower, but loses them in the parking garage. Inside the garage, Quint is seen on the security cameras, but no-one recognizes him. Back at the restaurant, Quint is warned by Johnson that he will not get paid and the government's case against The Lucky Dollar will be thrown out of court unless the disk is returned within three days. Quint then goes to Windom and his team and asks for their help in getting the car back, but they refuse, insisting that they go to the police first.

After getting the blueprints for the towers from city hall, Quint begins staking them out. The Ryland Towers are a pair of office buildings built by Ed Ryland (Robert Vaughn), who is also the head of the stolen car syndicate. The basement of the towers is a large chop shop, and Ryland keeps the best cars for himself and sells the rest. He scolds Nina for stealing a car he does not want and cannot possibly resell, but he also will not allow her to keep it for herself. After seeing Nina leave the towers, Quint follows her to a nightclub. At the club, they meet and go to her apartment. They have sex, then he asks her to help him get the car back; to which she does not respond. Later, Windom and his team go to the towers to look for evidence to give to the police. Ryland's goons kill one of the team members, so they go back to Quint and offer their assistance. Meanwhile, Ringer has tracked down Quint, and he and his men attack him, demanding the return of the disk. Quint is able to kill two of the henchmen, but Ringer gets away.

The next day, Nina is summoned by Ryland who confronts her with the tape of Quint outside of the garage, and a tape of them having sex. Deeming her a traitor, he locks her in the closet. Meanwhile, Quint and Windom determine that since the chop shop entrance is impenetrable from the garage, the best way to get in is through the unfinished, unsecured second tower. While Windom destroys the security cameras, Quint goes up the empty tower, crosses over to the other one, and heads down. While descending down a ventilation shaft, he discovers Nina in the locked closet and gets her out. She then agrees to help Quint steal the Black Moon. After knocking out a guard and stealing his uniform, Quint and Nina enter the chop shop and take the Black Moon. Ryland has since learned that Nina is no longer locked up and sees her in the garage. Windom is on the other side of the garage door and blows a hole in it with C-4, but emergency bars drop down to cover the hole in the door, stopping Quint and Nina from escaping.

Quint drives the Black Moon into the freight elevator, which takes them to Ryland's office. During the chase on that floor, Nina activates the turbo boost that makes the car reach its top speed. The car then shoots towards a window, hitting and killing Ryland instantly. The car then goes through the window and flies into the unoccupied building. Just as they think they are safe and Quint gets the disk out from the bumper, Ringer shows up to retrieve it. He and Quint start fighting just as Johnson shows up. After a brutal fistfight, Quint knocks out Ringer and takes back the disk and gives it to Johnson, allowing himself to retire. Windom then shows up and is grateful his car is still in one piece, but wonders how they will get it down. The movie ends back at Nina's apartment, where Quint asks her if she is happy she stole the Black Moon. After she says yes, he says that he is too.

Cast
 Tommy Lee Jones as Sam Quint
 Linda Hamilton as Nina
 Robert Vaughn as Ed Ryland
 Richard Jaeckel as Earl Windom
 Bubba Smith as FBI Agent Johnson
 Dan Shor as Billy Lyons
 Keenan Wynn as John "Iron John"
 Lee Ving as Marvin Ringer
 William Sanderson as Tyke Thayden
 Nick Cassavetes as Luis
 Don Keith Opper as Emile French
 Townsend Coleman as the Waiter

Production
John Carpenter wrote the script around the time he made Escape from New York. "It was my 'my car is stolen and I'm going to get it back' story," he said. "I have never seen the final film."

Car
The Black Moon was based on the 1980 Wingho Concordia II designed by Bernard Beaujardins and Clyde Kwok, made by Wingho Auto Classique in Montreal. Only one of these had been built, so in the movie, a copy of the car cast from a mold was used for stunts, as well as a third replica of the interior only.

Reception
Vincent Canby of The New York Times wrote in his review: "At the start of Black Moon Rising, a new, semi-caper movie, the FBI hires a freelance thief named Quint to break into the accounting department of a private company to obtain records needed in a grand jury investigation. However, Black Moon Rising is not about the F.B.I. and dirty tricks. It's about Quint's attempts to retrieve the records he has stolen after he has hidden them in the trunk of the prototype of a fancy new car, the Black Moon, which itself is then stolen. Thievery as a way of life is what Black Moon Rising is all about. It's the kind of movie in which thieves are made for each other – in which Nina (Linda Hamilton), a beautiful thief of automobiles, says to Quint (Tommy Lee Jones), just before he possesses her in her high-tech loft, Please, don't lie to me. It's also a movie in which people spend a great deal of time getting into and out of cars, or pursuing each other in cars, a lot of them stolen. The film, which opens today at the Criterion and other theaters, sounds pretty silly, and it is, but it's not painful to watch. Harley Cokliss, the director, and John Carpenter, Desmond Nakano and William Gray, who wrote the screenplay, never allow credibility to worry them, or even those of us in the audience. Like a stolen car, it moves pretty fast, if erratically. It has a tendency to put Quint into impossible situations from which he walks away with unexplained ease. [...] Black Moon Rising is very much a January movie – something to fill a booking gap."

Review aggregator Rotten Tomatoes gives the film a rating of 43%, based on 14 reviews, with an average rating of 4.31/10.

Release
The film was released in US theatres on January 10, 1986.

Home media
The film was released on DVD on January 30, 2001 initially, then on December 7, 2007, and finally on November 1, 2011, by Anchor Bay Entertainment. It was released on Blu-ray from Kino Lorber on May 14, 2019.

References

Sources

External links
 
 
 

1986 films
1980s action thriller films
1980s crime thriller films
American action thriller films
American crime thriller films
1980s English-language films
Films directed by Harley Cokeliss
New World Pictures films
Films about automobiles
Films with screenplays by John Carpenter
Films scored by Lalo Schifrin
Films set in the Las Vegas Valley
Films shot in Los Angeles
Films shot in Los Angeles County, California
1980s American films